The Hendy Aircraft Company was an early 1930s British light aircraft design company.

History
The company was formed as a partnership between Basil B. Henderson and H.A. Miles at 7 Park Lane, London, with Henderson being the chief designer. Most of the aircraft were built by Parnall & Sons and in 1935 Parnall Aircraft Limited was formed when the two companies were merged along with Nash and Thompson Limited.

Aircraft
1929 - Hendy Hobo single-seat light monoplane, one built.
1929 - Hendy 302 two-seat cabin monoplane, one built. 
1934 - Hendy 3308 Heck four-seat cabin monoplane, later known as the Parnall Heck. Designed to order for Whitney Straight and built by Westland. Further five built by Parnall.

References

Further reading

Defunct aircraft manufacturers of England